The following is a list of state forests in the U.S. state of Michigan. The Michigan Department of Natural Resources manages the largest state forest system in the nation (2.8 million acres (16,000 km²)), administered by the Forest Resources Division.

In literature describing recreational uses of state forest lands, six state forests are identified. However, state forest lands are administered by fifteen DNR Forest Management Units (FMU).  There is no state forest land in the southern portion of the Lower Peninsula.

Upper Peninsula 
Copper Country State Forest
Baraga FMU (Baraga, Gogebic, Houghton, Keweenaw, and Ontonagon counties) 
Crystal Falls FMU (Dickinson and Iron counties) 
Escanaba River State Forest
Escanaba FMU (most of Delta and Menominee counties) 
Gwinn FMU (west Alger and Marquette counties) 
Lake Superior State Forest
Newberry FMU (Luce and northwest Chippewa counties) 
Sault Ste. Marie FMU (southeast Chippewa and Mackinac counties) 
Shingleton FMU (east Alger, southeast Delta, Schoolcraft counties)

Northern Lower Peninsula 
Mackinaw State Forest
Atlanta FMU (Alpena, northeast Cheboygan, most of Montmorency, and most of Presque Isle counties) 
Gaylord FMU (Antrim, Charlevoix, most of Cheboygan, Emmet, and most of Otsego counties) 
Pigeon River Country FMU (southeast Cheboygan, northwest Montmorency, northeast Otsego, and southwest Presque Isle counties) 
Pere Marquette State Forest
Cadillac FMU (Lake, Mason, Mecosta, Missaukee, Newaygo, Oceana, Osceola, and Wexford counties) 
Traverse City FMU (Benzie, Grand Traverse, Leelanau, Kalkaska, Manistee counties) 
Au Sable State Forest
Gladwin FMU (Arenac, Bay, Clare, Gladwin, southern Iosco, Isabella, and Midland counties) 
Grayling FMU (Alcona, Crawford, Oscoda, and northern Iosco counties) 
Roscommon FMU (Ogemaw and Roscommon counties)

References 
Map of DNR Forest Management Units
 Upper Peninsula State Forest Campgrounds and Pathways (PDF)
 Northern Lower Peninsula State Forest Campgrounds and Pathways (PDF)

See also 
 List of U.S. National Forests

 
Michigan
State forests